The BWF World Senior Championships is a badminton tournament for players aged 35 and older sanctioned by Badminton World Federation (BWF). The winners will be crowned as the "World Senior Champions" and awarded gold medals. However, it does not offer any prize money. The tournament started in 2003 and being held biennially.

Location of the World Senior Championships
The table below gives an overview of all host cities and countries of the World Senior Championships. The most recent games were held in Huelva. The number in parentheses following the city/country denotes how many times that city/country has hosted the championships.

Medal table

Medal distribution

Men's singles

Women's singles

Men's doubles

Women's doubles

Mixed doubles

See also
BWF World Championships

References

External links
Official website

 
Senior
Senior sports competitions
Recurring sporting events established in 2003